Colposternus is a genus of beetles in the family Ptinidae. There is at least one described species in Colposternus, C. tenuilineatus.

References

Further reading

 
 
 
 
 

Ptinidae